The Reporter is an Indian Malayalam mystery thriller-romance film directed by Venugopan. The film stars Kailash, Samuthirakani, Ananya and Abhinaya. The film completed shooting in 2012 but had a late release in 2015. The plot of the movie is loosely based on Soumya homicide and emphasizes on how being silent to a crime is a crime in itself.

Plot
Eby Mathew was engaged to Sara, who falls prey to one of the most brutal cases of rape and subsequent homicide. The fate of Sara would have been different, if the other passengers of the same train were not so ignorant to the glimpses of the unusual. They also prevent Ravi Pillai, a fellow passenger (and a friend of Eby, although he doesn't know that Sara was the victim), from responding.

Grief-stricken Eby feels the passengers are as guilty as the criminal, although they are not culprits in the eyes of the law. With the help of Ravi Pillai, he kidnaps each of them for seeking revenge, but finally lets them go when they regret their misdeed.

Cast

Music
The film's soundtrack was composed by Sharreth. The lyrics of these songs are written by Vayalar Sarath Chandra Varma.

References

External links
 
 Mathrubhumi article
 Deepika article

Films scored by Sharreth
2015 films
2010s Malayalam-language films
2010s mystery thriller films
2010s romantic thriller films
Indian mystery thriller films
Indian romantic thriller films